The following are the national records in athletics in Kiribati maintained by Kiribati's national athletics federation: Kiribati Athletics Association (KAA).

Outdoor
Key to tables:

h = hand timing

NWI = no wind information

Men

Women

Indoor

Men

Women

References
General
Kiribati Records 22 February 2021 updated
Specific

External links
KAA web site

Kiribati
Records
Athletics
Athletics